End of a Hollywood Bedtime Story is the first album by the Dears. It was released in 2000 on Grenadine Records. "This is a Broadcast", "Heartless Romantic" and the title track were notable singles from the album.

Critical reception
Trouser Press wrote that the album "suffers from overly earnest and often puerile songwriting craftiness; the album is quirky, unpredictable, but also jejune and fragmented."

Track listing
All songs written by Murray Lightburn. 
 "C'était pour la passion" - 4:59
 "Jazz Waltz No. 3 in B-Flat" - 5:35
 "This Is a Broadcast" - 3:21
 "Where the World Begins and Ends" - 6:19
 "Heartless Romantic" - 4:37
 "End of a Hollywood Bedtime Story" - 5:08
 "There Is No Such Thing as Love" - 10:06
 "Partir, par Terre" - 1:35

References

2000 debut albums
The Dears albums